The following radio stations broadcast on the FM frequency 94.7 MHz:

Algeria
  Jil FM : Also broadcast two webradios : "Jil FM Web" and "Jil FM Musique".

Argentina
 947 Club Octubre in Buenos Aires
 Ahijuna in Bernal, Buenos Aires
 Ciudad in Bahía Blanca, Buenos Aires
 Ciudad in Carcaraña, Santa Fe
 Concierto in Santa Fe de la Vera Cruz, Santa Fe
 Concierto in Guandacol, La Rioja
 del Plata in La Rioja
 Impacto in Taco Pozo, Chaco
 Lasers in La Plata, Buenos Aires
 La Minga in Villa Giardino, Córdoba
 La única in Pilar, Buenos Aires
 Loca Suelta in Córdoba
 Natagala in Resistencia, Chaco
 Palermo in Buenos Aires
 Positivo in Azul, Buenos Aires
 Radio María in Junín, Buenos Aires
 Radio María in Presidente Roque Saenz Peña, Chaco
 Radio María in Villa Angela, Chaco
 Radio María in Cruz del Eje, Córdoba
 Radio María in Zapala, Neuquén
 Sol in Esquel, Chubut
 TX in Villa Gobernador Gálvez, Santa Fe
 Uno in Funes, Santa Fe

Australia
 2MCE in Orange, New South Wales
 Triple J in Tamworth, New South Wales
 ABC Classic FM in Cairns, Queensland
 Hot FM in Emerald, Queensland
 3PLS in Geelong, Victoria

Canada (Channel 234)
 CBWI-FM in Ilford, Manitoba
 CFAO-FM in Alliston, Ontario
 CFEB-FM in Nikamo, Quebec
 CFLW-FM in Wabush, Newfoundland and Labrador
 CHEY-FM in Trois Rivieres, Quebec
 CHGS-FM in Geraldton, Ontario
 CHKF-FM in Calgary, Alberta
 CHKX-FM in Hamilton/Burlington, Ontario
 CHOZ-FM in St. John's, Newfoundland and Labrador
 CIAM-FM-6 in Hines Creek, Alberta
 CILC-FM in Celista, British Columbia
 CIRP-FM in Spryfield, Nova Scotia
 CIRX-FM-2 in Fort St. James, British Columbia
 CJDS-FM in St-Pamphile, Quebec
 CJLS-FM-3 in Yarmouth, Nova Scotia
 CJNE-FM in Nipawin, Saskatchewan
 CKGN-FM-1 in Smooth Rock Falls, Ontario
 CKKQ-FM-1 in Sooke, British Columbia
 CKLF-FM in Brandon, Manitoba
 VF2534 in Cherryville, British Columbia

China 
 CNR Business Radio in Yingkou
 CNR Music Radio in Jilin City
 CNR The Voice of China in Changde

Ireland
 Spin South West - North Tipperary transmitter

Japan
 MRT Radio in Miyazaki
 SBS Radio in Hamamatsu, Shizuoka

Malaysia
 TraXX FM in Maran, Pahang

Mexico
XHDEN-FM in Lázaro Cárdenas, Michoacán
XHDK-FM in Guadalajara, Jalisco
XHETS-FM in Tapachula, Chiapas
XHGAP-FM in Guadalupe, Zacatecas
XHHB-FM in Hermosillo, Sonora (plus 14 relay transmitters on 94.7)
XHJUX-FM in Santiago Juxtlahuaca, Oaxaca
XHLI-FM in Chilpancingo, Guerrero
XHOZ-FM in Querétaro, Querétaro
XHPEAA-FM in Ciudad Valles, San Luis Potosi
XHPENS-FM in Ensenada, Baja California
XHPTUL-FM in Tulúm, Quintana Roo
XHPW-FM in Poza Rica, Veracruz
XHRCF-FM in Tuxtla Gutiérrez, Chiapas
XHRP-FM in Saltillo, Coahuila
XHST-FM in Mazatlán, Sinaloa
XHTJ-FM in Gómez Palacio, Durango
XHTSI-FM in Parangaricutiro, Michoacán
XHXU-FM in Frontera, Coahuila

Philippines
DWLL in Manila
DYLL-FM in Cebu City
DXLL-FM in Davao City
DWCZ in Legazpi City

South Africa
 947

Trinidad and Tobago
 Star 947

United States (Channel 234)
 KAMX in Luling, Texas
  in Corpus Christi, Texas
  in Caledonia, Minnesota
  in Chadron, Nebraska
 KDNY-LP in Hope, Arkansas
 KEWB (FM) in Anderson, California
  in Big River, California
 KGRW in Friona, Texas
 KHWC-LP in Harrison, Montana
  in San Angelo, Texas
 KJBB-LP in Brownsboro, Texas
 KJNN-LP in Holbrook, Arizona
 KKCK in Springfield, Minnesota
 KKDO in Fair Oaks, California
 KLBU in Santa Fe, New Mexico
 KLJK in Weiner, Arkansas
  in Thousand Palms, California
 KMCH in Manchester, Iowa
  in Clinton, Iowa
 KMMS-FM in Bozeman, Montana
  in Norfolk, Nebraska
  in Camas, Washington
 KPIP-LP in Fayette, Missouri
 KPZX in Paducah, Texas
 KQOP-LP in Charles City, Iowa
 KREF-FM in Oklahoma City, Oklahoma
  in Lafayette, Colorado
  in Rogue River, Oregon
 KRYE in Beulah, Colorado
 KSHE in Crestwood, Missouri
 KSKU in Sterling, Kansas
 KSWC-LP in Winfield, Kansas
  in Springfield, Missouri
 KTWV in Los Angeles, California
 KTXO in Goldsmith, Texas
  in Honolulu, Hawaii
 KVDR in Brackettville, Texas
 KVLL-FM in Wells, Texas
 KWCB-LP in Wasco, California
 KWKQ in Graham, Texas
  in Hilo, Hawaii
 KYHD in Valliant, Oklahoma
 KYHW-LP in Gardnerville, Nevada
 KYSE in El Paso, Texas
 KYTF-LP in Blair, Nebraska
  in Manson, Washington
 KZGF in Grand Forks, North Dakota
  in Houston, Alaska
 WAAK-LP in Boynton, Georgia
 WAAW in Williston, South Carolina
  in Lake Luzerne, New York
 WBCQ-FM in Monticello, Maine
  in Philpot, Kentucky
  in Cresson, Pennsylvania
 WCSX in Birmingham, Michigan
  in Bronson, Michigan
  in Americus, Georgia
  in Dover, Delaware
  in Elkins, West Virginia
  in Indianapolis, Indiana
 WFBU-LP in Graceville, Florida
  in New Albany, Indiana
 WGLJ-LP in Gainesville, Florida
  in Cookeville, Tennessee
  in Bethesda, Maryland
  in Deposit, New York
 WJCR-LP in Jasper, Tennessee
  in Jackson, Mississippi
 WJVQ-LP in Poughkeepsie, New York
 WKIU-LP in Tupelo, Mississippi
  in Paintsville, Kentucky
 WLIX-LP in Ridge, New York
  in Chicago, Illinois
 WLYT-LP in Mooresville, North Carolina
 WMAS-FM in Enfield, Connecticut
  in Cape Vincent, New York
 WMTT-FM in Tioga, Pennsylvania
 WNHN-LP in Concord, New Hampshire
  in Bayamon, Puerto Rico
 WOJG in Bolivar, Tennessee
 WOZZ in Mosinee, Wisconsin
 WPES-LP in Savannah, Georgia
  in Gifford, Florida
 WQDR-FM in Raleigh, North Carolina
 WQLR in Chateaugay, New York
 WQNH-LP in Deerfield, New Hampshire
  in Columbus, Ohio
  in Brundidge, Alabama
 WULK in Crawfordville, Georgia
 WVFP-LP in Gainesville, Florida
  in Sumter, South Carolina
 WWEZ-LP in Saint Simons Island, Georgia
  in Erie, Pennsylvania
 WXBK in Newark, New Jersey
  in Lacombe, Louisiana
 WZOR in Mishicot, Wisconsin
 WZYK in Clinton, Kentucky

Uruguay
Emisora del Sur in Montevideo

Reference

Lists of radio stations by frequency